Søgne og Songdalen Budstikke (The Søgne and Songdalen Bidding Stick) was a politically independent local Norwegian newspaper covering the municipalities of Søgne and Songdalen in Vest-Agder county.
The newspaper was published between 1999 and 2020. 

After its launch in 1999, Søgne og Songdalen Budstikke was partly owned by newspaper Fædrelandsvennen, but later became part of Schibsted. The printed edition was published every Wednesday morning. 

Originally located in Søgne, the paper moved to Mandal during its latter days.

Circulation
According to the Norwegian Audit Bureau of Circulations and National Association of Local Newspapers, Søgne og Songdalen Budstikke has had the following annual circulation:
 2006: 2,608
 2007: 2,719
 2008: 2,793
 2009: 2,890
 2010: 3,021
 2011: 3,008
 2012: 3,072
 2013: 3,306
 2014: 3,012
 2015: 3,069
 2016: 2,920

References

Newspapers published in Norway
Norwegian-language newspapers
Søgne
Mass media in Vest-Agder
Publications established in 1999
1999 establishments in Norway